Ronald Girones (born May 10, 1983, in Guantánamo) is a male judoka from Cuba, who won the bronze medal in the men's lightweight division (– 73 kg) at the 2007 Pan American Games, alongside Canada's Nicholas Tritton. He represented his native country at the 2008 Summer Olympics.

References
 sports-reference

1983 births
Living people
Judoka at the 2007 Pan American Games
Judoka at the 2008 Summer Olympics
Judoka at the 2011 Pan American Games
Olympic judoka of Cuba
Sportspeople from Guantánamo
Cuban male judoka
Pan American Games bronze medalists for Cuba
Pan American Games medalists in judo
Central American and Caribbean Games gold medalists for Cuba
Competitors at the 2006 Central American and Caribbean Games
Central American and Caribbean Games medalists in judo
Medalists at the 2007 Pan American Games
Medalists at the 2011 Pan American Games
20th-century Cuban people
21st-century Cuban people